
Gmina Kotuń is a rural gmina (administrative district) in Siedlce County, Masovian Voivodeship, in east-central Poland.

Villages
Gmina Kotuń contains the villages and settlements of Albinów, Bojmie, Broszków, Cisie-Zagrudzie, Czarnowąż, Gręzów, Jagodne, Józefin, Kępa, Koszewnica, Kotuń, Łączka, Łęki, Marysin, Mingosy, Niechnabrz, Nowa Dąbrówka, Oleksin, Pieńki, Pieróg, Polaki, Rososz, Ryczyca, Sionna, Sosnowe, Trzemuszka, Tymianka, Wilczonek, Żdżar, Żeliszew Duży and Żeliszew Podkościelny.

Neighbouring gminas
Gmina Kotuń is bordered by the city of Siedlce and by the gminas of Grębków, Kałuszyn, Mokobody, Mrozy, Siedlce and Skórzec.

References

Polish official population figures 2006

Kotun
Siedlce County